Roman Catholic Diocesan Schools in Santa Ana, California are private parochial schools operated by the Roman Catholic diocese in Santa Ana, California.

Listing of schools

K-8 schools
School of Our Lady
2204 W. McFadden Ave.
Santa Ana, CA 92704
http://schoolofourlady.org

Santa Ana Nativity School
601 N. Western Ave.
Santa Ana, 92703-2930

Saint Joseph School
608 Civic Center Drive East
Santa Ana, CA 92701-4199

Saint Barbara School
5306 West McFadden Avenue
Santa Ana, CA 92704-1799

Saint Anne School
1324 South Main Street
Santa Ana, CA 92707-0173

High school
Mater Dei High School
1202 West Edinger Avenue
Santa Ana, CA 92707-2191

School histories

School of Our Lady
School of Our Lady is a Catholic school established in January 2005 under the auspices of the Bishop of Orange, the pastors of Immaculate Heart of Mary, Our Lady of the Pillar parishes, the Office of Faith Formation for the Roman Catholic Diocese of Orange and the principal of the school. It serves children from the two parishes and surrounding parishes. The school opened in the academic year 2005-06 with a K - 8 educational program.

The school is housed in an existing, renovated 16 classroom facility on the grounds that is the parish of Immaculate Heart of Mary. The grounds of Immaculate Heart of Mary parish are spacious enough to support a large asphalt playground with existing courts for volleyball and basketball etc., a grass field that meets the requirements for flag football, a covered lunch table area, and a safety approved piece of playground equipment that can support the student body.

Immaculate Heart of Mary parish was established in 1960 and Our Lady of the Pillar Parish was established in 1965. Both parishes had functioning schools through the end of the school year 2005. At the request of the Bishop of Orange, a committee was formed to conduct an extensive study of the two schools in 2004. The study was based on diminishing enrollment and extensive financial support given from the parishes to the schools for operating expenses. Upon reviewing all of the data from the committee, a decision was made by the Bishop of Orange and his Executive Committee to merge the two schools. That merger resulted in the formation of School of Our Lady.

School of Our Lady administration and faculty are certified, credentialed teachers in accordance with the standards set by the Institute of Pastoral Ministry for the Diocese of Orange and the California State Department of Education. The teacher/student class ratio at School of Our Lady is set at approximately 30 to 1, except in the primary class rooms where aides are utilized to help implement the academic program under the direction of the classroom teacher. The largest class for the school year 2006-2007 has 25 students. In addition to standard core curriculum subjects, School of Our Lady offers Technology, Music, Art, Dance, PE and Library. A Title 1 tutor is available two days a week for eligible students and a faculty Inclusion Teacher is available to provide one on one tutoring for all School of Our Lady students regardless of income or residence . Extra-curricular activities include team sports (football, basketball, volleyball and softball,) newspaper, altar servers, and choir. Band is offered through the Mater Dei Band program.

Santa Ana
Education in Santa Ana, California